The PDC Pro Tour is a series of non-televised darts tournaments organised by the Professional Darts Corporation (PDC). They comprise Professional Dart Players Association (PDPA) Players Championships and European Tour events. Only four players have gone on to win at least 30 titles on the PDC Pro Tour. Michael van Gerwen has won the most Pro Tour titles winning 84. Phil Taylor is second on the list winning 70 events, Peter Wright third winning 32 events and Gary Anderson in fourth winning 31 events, as of September 2022.

PDC Pro Tour Order of Merit:

Pro Tour Card

Since 2011, the PDC Pro Tour has operated a Tour Card system. 128 players are granted Tour Cards, which enables them to participate in all Players Championships.

In 2011, Tour Cards were awarded to:
101 players from the PDC Order of Merit after the 2011 World Championship
2 finalists from the 2010 PDC Women's World Championship
25 qualifiers from a four-day Qualifying School in Wigan (4 semi-finalists from each day, plus the top 9 players from the Q School Order of Merit)

Tour Cards were also offered to the four semi-finalists from the 2011 BDO World Championship, although none of the players took up the offer.

From 2012 onwards, the PDC Tour Cards were awarded to:
Top 64 players from the PDC Order of Merit after the World Championship (having competed in at least ten events)
Tour Card holders from previous year's Qualifying School
Tour card holders from previous year's invitations (BDO World Championship & World Youth Championship)
4 semi-finalists from the 2012 BDO World Championship
2 finalists from the 2012 World Youth Championship
At least 16 qualifiers from a four-day Qualifying School (more places will be awarded via this method if not all the above spaces are filled)

From 2015 onwards, the PDC withdrew the Tour Cards awarded to BDO semi-finalists. The new distribution of Tour Cards is as follows:
Top 64 players from the PDC Order of Merit after the World Championship (having competed in at least ten events)
Tour Card holders from previous year's Qualifying School
Four tour card holders from previous year's invitations (PDC Challenge Tour & PDC Development Tour)
Two highest qualifiers from the PDC Challenge Tour, a series of tournaments for non-Tour Card holders
Two highest qualifiers from the PDC Development Tour, a series of tournaments for youth players
At least 16 qualifiers from a four-day Qualifying School (more places will be awarded via this method if not all the above spaces are filled)

Players Championships
Players Championships, originally known as PDPA Players Championships, are organised by the Professional Dart Players Association (PDPA) and have increased in number in recent years. They are known as "floor tournaments", because they usually feature 16 darts boards in close proximity on an arena floor where the tournament is played in the space of a day. Televised events differ by having just one main board on a stage with the audience and cameras situated around it.

Eligibility for these events are usually restricted to PDPA members only, however tournaments held outside of the United Kingdom often allow entry to non-PDPA members who are residents of the country staging the tournament. Some overseas players from the BDO take the opportunity of playing in PDC Players Championships in their home countries.

Order of Merit
The prize money won in Players Championships count towards the PDC Order of Merit, which contributes to each player's world ranking.

During 2007, the PDC and PDPA added further importance to Players Championships by changing qualification criteria for major televised events. A separate Players Championship Order of Merit was introduced which calculates players earnings for these tournaments only each calendar year. The players who won the most money (without qualifying automatically via the PDC Order of Merit) were awarded qualifying places at major tournaments, such as the World Matchplay, World Grand Prix and World Championship.

Previously, a sudden-death knockout qualifying tournament decided the players which meant players could miss out on tournaments because of unlucky matches or unlucky draws. The World Championship, however, still maintains an additional qualifying tournament – from which Kirk Shepherd emerged and went on to reach the world final itself in 2008. This was dropped for the 2010 running of the event, however it was reinstated for 2011.

Entries
PDPA members must enter events through the PDC's online entry system, while non-PDPA members must enter through the local organiser for the relevant event. The entry fee for all Players Championships is £100 for Tour Card holders.

In addition, seedings for Players Championship events are determined by a one-year rolling Players Championship Order of Merit, consisting of prize money won in Players Championships over the 12 months before that event. The top 32 players in the Order of Merit that have entered the tournament are seeded.

All UK Players Championship events have a 128-player draw.

All non-UK Players Championship events consist of no more than 256 players, with all Tour Card holders that have entered the event starting at the last 128 stage.

If fewer than 128 players enter a Players Championship event, byes are awarded to players in order of their seeding. For example, if there is one bye, the number 1 seed will receive a bye into the last 64.

Prize money
The prize money for PDC Pro Tour events has increased steadily over the years. Prize money is awarded to all players who reach at least the last 64 of a Pro Tour event. In the past, Players Championships held outside of Europe awarded less prize money than those held in the United Kingdom or Europe.

In 2011, all Players Championship events and UK Open qualifiers awarded £34,600 each, but from 2013 on Players Championship events awarded £50,000.

Up to 2013 on the Pro Tour, there was also a rolling jackpot for nine-dart finishes. £500 (Players Championship events) / £400 (UK Open qualifiers) per event is reserved for any player who hits a nine-dart finish, with the money rolling over to the next event if the feat is not achieved. If more than one player hits a nine-darter in an event, the jackpot is shared.

Prize funds for Pro Tour events over the years:

PDC European Tour

In 2012, the PDC introduced a series of five tournaments held across Europe known as the European Tour. The number of events has steadily risen with eight held in 2013 and 2014, nine in 2015, ten in 2016, twelve in 2017, and as of 2018, there are thirteen events. These events see the top players on the PDC Order of Merit compete against players from a UK qualifier, European qualifier and home nations qualifier (the country where the event is held). Currently the prize fund for each tournament is £140,000, with £25,000 going to the winner. These events differ from others held on the Pro Tour as they are played on one board in front of an audience. They are not televised, but selected events have been available on the PDC's YouTube channel in the past. All events are now shown live on the PDC's PDCHD-TV website.

UK Open Qualifiers
The UK Open is a major tournament that takes place each year in March at Butlin's Minehead. From 2003 to 2013 the tournament took place at Bolton's Reebok Stadium each year in June. Prior to the televised event, there were eight UK Open Qualifiers (originally named Regional Finals), where the prize money won was collated into a UK Open Order of Merit table which determined the 96 qualifiers for the UK Open finals in Bolton. From 2003 to 2015 there were ties and a preliminary round would be used to reduce the field to 96. In 2016 ties were scrapped and countback was used to separate players who were level.

The tournaments were organised similarly to the Players Championships in that 32 boards were in operation for a non-televised "floor tournament", completed in one day. During the 2007–08 UK Open, sponsors Blue Square streamed live coverage of these Regional Finals on the internet.

From 2011 until 2013, the UK Open Qualifiers were held on four double-header weekends instead of being held on eight Sundays. From 2014 onwards there were only 6 UK Open Qualifiers. UK Open Qualifiers were abolished in 2019, as all tour card holders were invited to the UK Open from then on.

References

External links
Darts Database calendar

 
2002 establishments in Europe
2002 establishments in Asia
2002 establishments in Africa
2002 establishments in North America
2002 establishments in South America
2002 establishments in Oceania
+
Sports competition series